Fighter Squadron 73 (VF-73), also known as the "Jesters", was a United States Navy fighter squadron established at Naval Air Station Quonset Point, Rhode Island on July 27, 1948 and disestablished on March 1, 1958.

Operational history
The cruise lasted from January 4, 1949 - May 22, 1949.

In 1955, VF-73 was once again attached to Carrier Air Group Seven. During the cruise, the Hornet helped cover the evacuation of Vietnamese from the Communist-controlled north to South Vietnam, then ranged from Japan to Formosa, Okinawa, and the Philippines in readiness training with the 7th Fleet. VF-73 returned to the United States with the Hornet on December 10, 1955.

Between August and December 1957, as political turmoil in Syria threatened to further disturb the region, the Randolph patrolled the eastern Mediterranean. The squadron returned to the United States on February 24, 1958.

See also 
Naval Aviation
List of United States Navy aircraft squadrons
List of Inactive United States Navy aircraft squadrons
List of Sabre and Fury units in US military
United States Naval Aviator
Military Aviation

References 

http://www.fader.dyndns.org/wings/19%20Navy-Sqn/VF/VF-073.htm
http://www.fader.dyndns.org/wings/20%20USNavy/CVW-07.htm
http://www.history.navy.mil/download/vf-lin.pdf
This article includes text from the public domain Dictionary of American Naval Fighting Ships
https://web.archive.org/web/20090414233245/http://www.chinfo.navy.mil/navpalib/ships/carriers/histories/cv12-hornet/cv12-hornet.html
http://www.chinfo.navy.mil/navpalib/ships/carriers/histories/cv15-randolph/cv15-randolph.html

Strike fighter squadrons of the United States Navy